The mir-BART2 microRNA precursor found in Human herpesvirus 4 (Epstein–Barr virus) and Cercopithicine herpesvirus 15. mir-BART2 is expressed in all stages of infection but expression is significantly elevated in the lytic stage. In Epstein-Barr virus, mir-BART2 is found in the intronic regions of the BART (Bam HI-A region rightward transcript) gene whose function is unknown. mir-BART2 is thought to target the virally encoded DNA polymerase BALF5 for degradation. The mature sequence is excised from the 5' arm of the hairpin.

References

External links 
 
 VMR_0123 in the VIRmiRNA database

MicroRNA
MicroRNA precursor families